The Samsung NX 20mm F2.8 Pancake is an interchangeable camera lens announced by Samsung on September 14, 2010.

See also
Pancake lens

References
http://www.dpreview.com/products/samsung/lenses/samsung_20_2p8/specifications

20
Pancake lenses
Camera lenses introduced in 2010